Östen Sandström (3 October 1910 – 10 March 1994) was a Swedish sprinter. He competed in the men's 4 × 100 metres relay at the 1936 Summer Olympics.

References

1910 births
1994 deaths
Athletes (track and field) at the 1936 Summer Olympics
Swedish male sprinters
Olympic athletes of Sweden
Place of birth missing
20th-century Swedish people